Jewish peoplehood (Hebrew: עמיות יהודית, Amiut Yehudit) is the conception of the awareness of the underlying unity that makes an individual a part of the Jewish people.

The concept of peoplehood has a double meaning. The first is descriptive, as a concept factually describing the existence of the Jews as a people - i.e a national ethnoreligious indigenous group, similar to the Tibetans, the Hindus, the Mayans etc. The second is normative, as a value that describes the feeling of belonging and commitment to the Jewish people.

The concept of Jewish peoplehood is a paradigm shift for some in Jewish life. Insisting that the mainstream of Jewish life is focused on Jewish nationalism (Zionism), they argue that Jewish life should instead focus on Jewish peoplehood, however the majority of Jews see peoplehood as encompassing both Jews living inside Israel and outside in diaspora.

The concept of peoplehood, or "Klal Yisrael" has permeated Jewish life for millennia, and to focus on it does not constitute a shift from the focus on Jewish nationhood. Jews have been extremely effective in sustaining a sense of joint responsibility towards their people and its members for over 2,000 years, since their displacement by the Romans, subsequent enslavement, dispersal as a refugee community throughout the world, and subsequent return to their homeland in 1948.

The concepts of Jews as a nation and as a peoplehood are not necessarily at odds with one another. The very concept of defining Jews as a people or civilization is historically accurate, and suggests a wide variety of values within the context of Judaism also.

Jewish writings

The concept of a distinctive Jewish people has been part of Jewish culture since the development of the Hebrew Bible. Throughout the Torah, Prophets and Writings, Jews are variously referred to as a congregation, a nation, children of Israel or even a kingdom, (Eda, Uma, Am, Bnei Israel, Mamlakha respectively) all implying a connection among people.

"And I will establish my covenant between me and you and your seed after you in their generations for an everlasting covenant, to be a God to you, and to your seed after you". Genesis 17:7/8

"There is a certain people scattered abroad and dispersed among the peoples in all the provinces of thy kingdom; and their laws are diverse from those of every people". Esther 3:8

"In each generation every individual should feel as though he or she had actually been redeemed from Egypt". The Haggadah

"Kol yisrael arevim zeh bazeh" – "All Israelites are sureties for one another". Talmud Shevuot 39a

Jewish nationhood
Goy גוי, in Biblical Hebrew, literally means "nation", and historically Jews are most commonly described with variations of this concept. In , the Jews are referred to as a goy kadosh (גוי קדוש), a "holy nation". ( and ). The "nation" concept refers not just to a territorial or political entity, i.e. the Kingdom of Judah, but in the ancient sense meaning a group of people with a common history, a common destiny, and a sense of connection to one another, an ethnos. The nationhood concept adhered to the biblical and religious identification as a chosen people, a holy nation set apart from the other nations in obedience to the One God. This conception of Jewishness helped to preserve the Jewish people during the diaspora, when Jews were "scattered among the nations". It was similarly invoked by the Zionist movement, which sought to Negate the Diaspora (shlilat ha'galut) by Gathering the exiled of Israel (Kibbutz Galuyot) back to their homeland, where they would achieve national self-determination.

Jewish peoplehood
Some modern Jewish leaders in the diaspora, particularly American Jews, found the traditional conception of Jews as a "nation among the nations" problematic, posing a challenge to integration and inviting charges of dual loyalty. The first significant use of the "peoplehood" concept was by Mordecai Kaplan, co-founder of the Reconstructionist School of Judaism, who was searching for a term that would enable him to describe the complex nature of Jewish belonging. Once the State of Israel was founded, he rejected the concept of nationhood, as it had become too closely identified with statehood, and replaced it with the peoplehood concept. In his work Judaism as a Civilization, Kaplan sought to define the Jewish people and religion in socio-cultural terms as well as religious ones.

Kaplan's definition of Judaism as "an evolving religious civilization" illumines his understanding of the centrality of Peoplehood in the Jewish religion. Describing Judaism as a religious civilization emphasizes the idea that Jewish people have sought "to make [their] collective experience yield meaning for the enrichment of the life of the individual Jew and for the spiritual greatness of the Jewish people." The definition as a civilization allows Judaism to accept the principles of unity in diversity and continuity in change. It is a reminder that Judaism consists of much that cannot be put into the category of religion in modern times, "paradoxical as it may sound, the spiritual regeneration of the Jewish people demands that religion cease to be its sole preoccupation." In the sense that existence precedes essence and life takes precedence over thought, Judaism exists for the sake of the Jewish people rather than the Jewish people existing for the sake of Judaism.

Kaplan's purpose in developing the Jewish Peoplehood idea was to create a vision broad enough to include everyone who identified as a Jew regardless of individual approaches to that identity.

In modern Jewish life
Since 2000, major Jewish organizations have embraced the peoplehood concept and intellectual interest in the topic has increased. Major organizations such as the Jewish Federations of North America, the JFNA New York Federation, the Jewish Agency for Israel, the Israel Ministry for Education, the Diaspora Museum, the Avi Chai Foundation, the American Jewish Committee and many other smaller organizations are either introducing the peoplehood concept as an organizing principle in their organizations or initiating high-profile programming with an explicit focus on Jewish Peoplehood.

Natan Sharansky, the Jewish Agency’s chairman, declared that the agency’s traditional Zionist mission had outlived its usefulness. In his new capacity, he has made Israel education and promoting Jewish Peoplehood a priority, particularly among the young.

Key characteristics
Alongside the use of the peoplehood concept by Jewish organizations, there is a parallel growth of intellectual interest in the topic since 2000. The intellectual discussion asks: What is "Jewish Peoplehood"? What are the key characteristics that distinguish Jewish Peoplehood from other concepts?

Areas of agreement
The areas of agreement among Jewish intellectuals writing about the concept of Jewish Peoplehood point to three principles:

The three unifying principles of the Jewish Peoplehood theory:

A multidimensional experience of Jewish belonging – The concept of Jewish Peoplehood assumes an understanding of Jewish belonging that is multidimensional.
Rejection of any dominant ideology, which over emphasizes one dimension of Jewishness - Strong ideological frameworks that overemphasize one dimension of the larger Jewish experience are not an acceptable starting point for understanding how individuals connect to the Jewish People.
Focus on the nature of the connection between Jews and not on the Jewish Identity - Those concerned with the Jewish Peoplehood concept do not focus on the identity of individuals, but rather on the nature of connections between Jews. The concern is with common elements and frameworks that enable Jews to connect with one another both emotionally and socially.

In combination, these three principles imbue the Peoplehood concept with coherence and offer an added value to organizations that wish to create programs “that build Jewish Peoplehood” in a sustainable and measurable way.

Different perspectives

There are several variants of the communitarian position among intellectuals writing about Jewish Peoplehood. The common denominator is the desire to find common ground upon which connections between Jews are built.

The four distinct positions regarding Jewish Peoplehood:

Peoplehood as a common destiny.
Peoplehood as a shared mission with an emphasis on Tikkun Olam.
Peoplehood as a shared kinship and mutual responsibility.
Peoplehood as an obligation.

For some critics, Jewish Peoplehood is still an amorphous and abstract concept that presents an optional ideological approach towards the Jewish collective. Others wonder if it is too weak a foundation on which to base Jewish collective identity, especially since the vision of Peoplehood is not predicated on having any kind of religious or spiritual identity.

See also
Who is a Jew?
Jewish identity

Footnotes

References
 A Framework for the Strategic Thinking about Jewish Peoplehood, Kopelowitz, E. and Engelberg A., Platforma, Jerusalem, 2007
 Peoplehood Now, sponsored by the NADAV Foundation, editors: Shlomi Ravid, Shelley Kedar, Research: Ari Engelberg, Elana Sztokman, Varda Rafaeli
 The Peoplehood Papers I, edited by Corbin K., Fram Plotkin A., Levine E., Most G., United Jewish Communities, New York, 2007
 The Peoplehood Papers II, edited by Serkin D,. Kol Dor, The International School for Jewish Peoplehood Studies at Beit Hatfutsot, Tel Aviv, 2008
 The Peoplehood Papers III, edited by Ravid S., Serkin T., United Jewish Communities, The International School for Jewish Peoplehood Studies at Beit Hatfutsot, Tel Aviv, 2008
 The Peoplehood Papers IV, edited by Ravid S., United Jewish Communities, Kol Dor, The Jewish Peoplehood HUB, Tel Aviv, 2009
  Jewish Peoplehood in an Age of Globalization, Dr Ami Bouganim, The Research and Development Unit of the Department of Jewish-Zionist, Education, 2007
 Are we ready for Jewish Peoplehood?, Moty Cristal, 2007, YNet News
 Peoplehood in the Bible
 Peoplehood in Rabbinic Texts
 Embattled Jewish Agency To Promote Identity Over Aliyah, Gal Beckerman, The Jewish Daily Forward, March 2010

Further reading
 The Case for Jewish Peoplehood: Can We Be One?, by Erica Brown, Misha Galperin, and Joseph Telushkin, 2009
 Jewish Peoplehood: Change and Challenge,  (Reference Library of Jewish Intellectual History) by Ezra Kopelowitz  and Menachem Reviv, 2008
 The Future of Jewish Peoplehood,''  by Arthur Waskow (1977)

External links
 Center for Jewish Peoplehood Education
 Policy publications on Jewish peoplehood at the Berman Jewish Policy Archive
 Jewish Peoplehood Resources, NADAV Foundation
 Dynamic Judaism: the essential writings by Mordechai M. Kaplan, Edited and with Introductions by Emanuel S. Goldsmith and Mel Scult
 Rabbi Mordechai Kaplan
 Jewish Peoplehood Index
 Be'chol Lashon – In Every Toung
 Peoplehood Research Blog
 Jewish Peoplehood HUB
 Envisioning Jewish Peoplehood
 The Koret International School for Jewish Peoplehood at Beit Hatfutsot

Jewish society
Jews